Heather Battaly is a professor of philosophy at the University of Connecticut specializing in virtue epistemology and epistemic virtues and vices. She is editor-in-chief of the Journal of Philosophical Research and the Journal of the American Philosophical Association.

References

Further reading 

 
 
 

Living people
Year of birth missing (living people)
University of Connecticut faculty